Rhizochilus is a genus of sea snails, marine gastropod mollusks in the family Muricidae, the murex snails or rock snails.

Species
Species within the genus Rhizochilus include:
 Rhizochilus antipathum Steenstrup, 1850
 Species brought into synonymy 
 Rhizochilus exaratus Pease, 1861 : synonym of  Coralliophila erosa (Röding, 1798)
 Rhizochilus madreporarum Sowerby: synonym of  Coralliophila monodonta (Blainville, 1832)
 Rhizochilus radula A. Adams, 1855  : synonym of  Coralliophila radula (A. Adams, 1855)
 Rhizochilus squamosissimus E.A. Smith, 1876  : synonym of  Coralliophila squamosissima (E.A. Smith, 1876)
 Rhizochilus teramachii Kuroda, 1953  : synonym of  Rhizochilus antipathum Steenstrup, 1850

References

 Vaught, K.C. (1989). A classification of the living Mollusca. American Malacologists: Melbourne, FL (USA). . XII, 195 pp

 
Monotypic gastropod genera